Kittson may refer to:

 Kittson County, Minnesota, United States
 USS Kittson (APA-123), a Haskell-class attack transport
 Kittson (processor), the codename for the Itanium 9700 processor series by Intel

People with the surname
 Jean Kittson (born 1955), Australian multi-talented performer and writer
 Norman Kittson (1814-1888), American fur trader, steamboat-line operator, and railway entrepreneur

See also

 Kitson (disambiguation)